Estadio Monumental Universidad Andina de Juliaca, also known as Estadio Monumental de la UANCV, is a multi-purpose stadium in Juliaca, Peru. It is currently used by football team C.D. Universidad Andina Néstor Cáceres Velásquez. The stadium holds 40,000 people and was built in 2012.

References

Monumental Universidad Andina de Juliaca
Multi-purpose stadiums in Peru
Buildings and structures in Puno Region